Tommy Paul was the defending champion, but chose to participate at men's singles qualifying instead and lost to Peter Gojowczyk in the second round.

Geoffrey Blancaneaux won the title, defeating Félix Auger-Aliassime in the final, 1–6, 6–3, 8–6.

Seeds

Draw

Finals

Top half

Section 1

Section 2

Bottom half

Section 3

Section 4

Qualifying

Seeds

Qualifiers

Draw

First qualifier

Second qualifier

Third qualifier

Fourth qualifier

Fifth qualifier

Sixth qualifier

Seventh qualifier

Eighth qualifier

References

External links 

Boys' Singles
2016